Kausar Nag or Kausarnag (sometimes alternatively spelled as Konsarnag), is a high-altitude oligotrophic lake located at an elevation of  above sea level. Kausar Nag is located in the Pir Panjal mountain range in Kulgam district  of Jammu and Kashmir, India. This lake is considered sacred in Hinduism.

Legends
It is believed that Manu's boat that carried the Vedas and the Saptarishi was stuck near this Lake after the Great flood.

Access
The Kausar Nag Lake is accessible during the summer and can be reached from its trail-head Aharbal, by a 36 km hiking trail. Aharbal is connected with Srinagar, a 70 km motorable road passes through the towns of Shopian and Pulwama.

See also
 Chiranbal
Aharbal
Mughal Road
Gangabal
Hirpora Wildlife Sanctuary
Kulgam district

References

Lakes of Jammu and Kashmir
Kulgam district